Étienne Becker (1 May 1936, Paris, France – 11 December 1995, Paris) was a French Director of Photography.

Life
He is the son of the French director Jacques Becker, and the brother of Jean Becker.

Filmography

References

External links
 Étienne Becker on IMDb

1936 births
1995 deaths
French cinematographers
French people of Irish descent
French people of Lorrainian descent